The Battle of Fatehpur was a key episode in the dissolution of the Samma Dynasty of Sindh and its replacement by the Arghun Dynasty. in 1519. The conflict between the Samma Dynasty of Sindh and the Arghuns lead to the Battle of Fatehpur.

History
Some Mughals had come to Sindh in the reign of Jam Feroz and settled there with the authorization of the Jam. Among them were Kabak Arghun who had left Shahhbeg's party due to a murder. Most of these Mughuls, mainly of tribes like Daolatshah and Nargahi tribes had been enlisted in his service by Jam Feróz, who entertained some doubts against loyalty of Darya Khan Lashari and wanted to secure some fearless men to work against him, when required. It was at the information and invitation of Kasim Kabaka, that Shahbeg marched against Thatta with a large army about the close of 914 AH (1508 AD).

Shahbeg's victory of Thatta
Shahbeg came to Fatehpur and Ganjabah to make warlike preparations by collecting and arranging troops. He left some chiefs in charge of those places, posted his own brother at Siwi and sent Mír Fázil Kókaltásh with 240 horses, as an advance party. The Sammah army of Sindh on passing through the district of 'Baghban' was joined at Talti, about 6 or 7 miles from Sehwan, by Darya Khan’s sons Mahmud Khan and Motan Khán. On the arrival of Shahbeg at the village of Baghbann, the chief men of the place hastened to pay their respects to him, which encouraged him to advance towards Thatta. Passing through the Lakí hills, he came within about 6 miles of Thatta southwards, where he halted and encamped on the bank of the Khánwáh. In those days the Indus river flowed to the south of Thatta and so he had to make arrangements to cross it. The spies soon found a native wayfarer, who, on pressure put upon him, pointed out the place where the river was fordable. It was on the 15th of Muharram 926 AH (1519 AD) that Sháhbeg rode into the river and led his whole force across, having left a party of soldiers to protect the camp at the river. Darya Khan, supreme commander, left his master Jam Feroz at the capital city and himself advanced with a large army and gave battle to the Arguns. A severe battle was fought, which ended in the victory of Shahbeg Argun. Jam Feroz hearing of the defeat of his army, fled across the river. Darya Khan was killed in the battle. Up to the 20th of the same month the Arguns plundered the city. Several women and children of respectable families were captured. Even the family of Jám Feróz remained in the city. It was at the intercession of Kazi Kazan, the most learned man of the time at Thatta, whose family members also had been taken prisoners, that Shahbeg stopped the plunder by giving an arrow to the Kazi to show it round to the plundering Mughuls. A proclamation was also issued to that effect, and once more there was order and quiet in the city.

Flight of Jam Feroz
Jam Feroz, with a few persons was tarrying in the village of Perar, anxious to get some information about his own and his father’s family, to protect whom, however, Sháhbeg had the good sense to post a party of his men round their residence. Seeing no help for it, he was obliged to send messengers to Sháhbeg recognizing him as his superior and asking for mercy. Sháhbeg sent back the messengers with presents and with promise of pardon on the Jám’s surrender. Accordingly Jám Feróz, taking his brothers and kinsmen with him issued from Perár to the bank of the river with a sword hanging round his neck as a mark of surrender. Sháhbeg ordered the Jám’s families to be taken across with due honour, and in the next month, Saffar, Sháhbeg encamped outside the city, where Jám Feróz came to pay homage to him in person. Sháhbeg received him well and gave him the rich robe of honour that his own father Amír Zunnún had received from king Muzaffar Husain. Sháhbeg was kind enough to give the governorship of Tattá to the Jám. But after some consultation with the chief men of the place it was resolved that as Sind was a spacious country, half of it might be given to Jám Feróz and the other half retained and left in charge of agents appointed by the Mughul prince. Accordingly the Lakí hills near Sehwán were fixed as the boundary. The country from Lakí down to Tattá was to remain under Jám Feróz, and that upwards to the north, to be retained by the agents of Sháhbeg. After this settlement was made and ratified, Sháhbeg left Tattá and marched out on his return journey.

Battle of Talti 
The rapid march and victory at Thatta  had left some of the chiefs at Sindh and their forces intact at Talti, where they had gathered to oppose the new conqueror of Sindh. Shahbeg received the homage of certain Sahtah and Sodha chiefs. He then came to Sehwan. He left Mír Alíkah Arghun, Sultan Mukimbeg Lar, Kíbak Arghun and Ahmad Tarkhan in charge of the place, and sent Sultan Mahmud Khan Kokaltash to take charge of Bakhar and himself proceeded to Shál to bring his family. At the same time he deputed Kazi Kazan to bring Mahmud Khan Lashari  and Motan Khan Lashari, two sons of Darya khan Lashari to surrender, but the Kazi did not succeed in his mission. Mahmud Khan Lashari and Motan Khan Lashari, and Jam Sarang and Rinmal Sodho were ready to submit but Makhdoom Bilawal,a learned man of the place persuaded them to resist Arguns in defense. Sháhbeg, was therefore obliged to come to Talti. Sháhbeg secured some boats and crossed the river with his army, with Mír Fázil Kókaltásh and the Arghún and Tarkhán forces. He surprised the advance guards of Samma resistance comprising Sodhas. As Rinmal with his brother Jódhó advanced to meet them Mír Fázil attacked them and defeated them. The fort of Talti was taken. Most of the Sammah troops were cut down, some drowned themselves in the river and a few fled to Sehwan. Rinmal Sodho’s brother Jodho was also among the slain.

Jám Salahuddin's second invasion of Thatta
After spending 3 days at Taltí Sháhbeg returned to Shál and Siwí, and Jám Feróz began to rule quietly at Thattá as before. But it was not long before Jám Saláhuddín, who had some time ago revolted against Jám Feróz and driven him away from his capital, and had subsequently been himself driven away by Daryá Khán to Gujrát, once more invaded Tattá with an army of 10,000 men, consisting chiefly of Járejás and Sódhá Khangárs. Jám Feróz, without losing time, hastened to Sháhbeg’s agents at Sehwán and through them sent some fleet messengers to Sháhbeg for help. The latter despatched his son Mírzá Sháh Hasan with a column of Mughuls for the purpose, and sent some more forces after him, by successive instalments.

Shahbeg’s son Shah Hasan comes to Jam Feroz’s help
On the 14th of Muharram 927 AH (1520 AD) Mirza Sháh Hasan left Shál for Sind, and after 20 days’ journey arrived in the vicinity of Tattá. Saláhuddín hearing of the Mughul’s approach left Tattá, recrossed the river and betook himself to the village of Jún. Jám Feróz received Mírzá Sháh Hasan gratefully and in return received marks of distinction and friendship from him. Saláhuddín was soon pursued and overtaken. A fight ensued between the advance columns of the two parties, one led by Haibat Alí Khán, Saláhuddín’s son, who was son-in-law to Sultán Muzaffar of Gujrát, and another by Mírzá Ísá Tarkhán, Sultán-kulíbeg and Mír Alíkah. Saláhuddín’s son was killed and his army routed. Mad with rage at his son’s death, Saláhuddín precipitated himself upon the Mughuls. But soon he too was slain and his army fled to Gujrát. After spending 3 days at the scene of the battle Jám Feróz went back to Tattá to settle affairs there and Mírzá Sháh Hasan returned to Bághbán to pay his respects to his father, who had come to that place. Here during their stay, the Máchhí tribes, who had become rather turbulent and refractory, were punished, their cattle and property plundered and their villages razed to the grounds.

References

Sindh
History of Sindh

Samma dynasty